Marko Buvinić (born 28 June 1992) is a retired Croatian handball player.

References

http://www.eurohandball.com/ec/cl/men/2015-16/player/550434/MarkoBuvinic

1992 births
Living people
Croatian male handball players
Sportspeople from Pula